Koenigsegg Automotive AB is a Swedish manufacturer of high-performance sports cars based in Ängelholm, Skåne County, Sweden.

Company

The company was founded in 1994 in Sweden by Christian von Koenigsegg, with the intention of producing a "world-class" sports car. Many years of development and testing led to the CC8S, the company's first street-legal production car which was introduced in 2002.

In 2006, Koenigsegg began production of the CCX, which uses an engine created in-house specifically for the car. The goal was to develop a car homologated for use worldwide, particularly the United States whose strict regulations did not allow the import of earlier Koenigsegg models.

In March 2009, the CCXR was listed by Forbes as one of "the world's most beautiful cars".

In December 2010, the Agera won the BBC Top Gear Hypercar of the Year Award.

Apart from developing, manufacturing and selling the Koenigsegg line of sports cars, Koenigsegg is also involved in "green technology" development programmes beginning with the CCXR ("Flower Power") flex-fuel sports car and continuing through the present with the Jesko. Koenigsegg is also active in development programs of plug-in electric cars' systems and next-generation reciprocating engine technologies. Koenigsegg has also developed a camless piston engine which found its first application in the Gemera, which was introduced in 2020.

Koenigsegg develops and produces most of the main systems, subsystems and components needed for their cars in-house instead of relying on subcontractors.

Koenigsegg has since then bought the stake back from NEVS and owns 100% of the company again.

History

Prototypes and production

The initial design of the CC was penned down by Christian von Koenigsegg. Industrial designer David Crafoord realised the sketches as a 1:5 scale model. This model was later scaled up in order to create the base plug for the initial Koenigsegg prototype that was finished in 1996. During the next years, the prototype went through extensive testing and several new prototypes were built. The prototypes initially used an Audi V8 engine but after the engine supply contract fell through, the next candidate was the Flat-12 race engine developed by Motori Moderni for the Scuderia Coloni Formula one team, in which this engine was raced under the Subaru badge in the 1990 season. These Subaru 1235 engines were purchased and modified for use in the CC; this deal failed when the founder of Motori Moderni died, sending the company into bankruptcy. Eventually Koenigsegg developed its own engine based on the Ford Modular architecture which was used in its early sports cars. Later on, Koenigsegg developed their own engines from scratch, including control systems and transmissions, which is very unusual for a small size sports car producer.

Factory history
Christian von Koenigsegg got the idea to build his own car after watching the Norwegian stop-motion animated movie Pinchcliffe Grand Prix in his youth. He took his first steps in the world of business in his early 20s running a trading company called Alpraaz in Stockholm, Sweden. Alpraaz exported food from Europe to the developing world. The success of this venture gave von Koenigsegg the necessary financial standing to launch his chosen career as a car manufacturer.

Initially, Koenigsegg Automotive was based in Olofström. In 1997, the company needed larger production facilities and moved to a farm, just outside Ängelholm. On 22 February 2003, one of the production facilities caught fire and was badly damaged. Koenigsegg then acquired an abandoned air field to use as his new factory building and in late 2003, one of the two large fighter-jet hangars and an office building were converted into a car factory. Since then, the company is located near the still-active Ängelholm airport, clients can arrive by private jet nearby. Koenigsegg controls and uses the former military runway for shakedown runs of production cars and high-speed testing.

The Koenigsegg badge was designed in 1994 by Jacob Låftman, based on the heraldic coat of arms of the Koenigsegg family. The shield has been the family's coat of arms since the 12th century when a family member was knighted by the Holy Roman Empire.

Ghost Badge 
After moving into the abandoned airfield, which once housed the Swedish air force's "Johan Röd" squadron, Koenigsegg adopted the "ghost symbol" that the squadron had on their planes, which were Saab AJS37 Viggens aircraft (the squad also used the English phrase "The show must go on" on their aircraft as well) as a tribute to the squadron. The badge is seen on models built in the factory that was converted from their hangar.

Attempted purchase of Saab
On 12 June 2009, the media reported that Koenigsegg Group, consisting of Koenigsegg Automotive AB, Christian von Koenigsegg, Bård Eker and a group of investors led by Mark Bishop had signed a letter of intent with Saab to take over the brand from General Motors. General Motors confirmed on 16 June that they had chosen Koenigsegg Group as the buyer of Saab Automobile. The deal, set to close 30 September 2009, included  in financing from the European Investment Bank, guaranteed by the Swedish government.

General Motors announced on 18 August that the deal had been signed, although certain financing details remained to be completed. On 9 September 2009, Koenigsegg announced that BAIC was going to join as a minority stakeholder in Koenigsegg.

In November 2009, Koenigsegg decided not to finalise the purchase of Saab and therefore, left the negotiations. The timing uncertainty of finalisation of the take over was the reason Koenigsegg stated for leaving the deal.

Models

A Koenigsegg CC prototype was first publicised in 1996, while the full carbon fibre production prototype having white paintwork was finally unveiled at the 2000 Paris Motor Show. The first customer took delivery of a red CC8S in 2002 at the Geneva Auto Show and four more cars were built that year. Koenigsegg was established in Asia later that year with a premiere at the Seoul Auto Show. In 2004, the new CCR, which was basically a high performance variant of the CC8S, was unveiled at the Geneva Auto Show; only 14 were produced.

In 2006, Koenigsegg introduced the CCX, a new model, that was developed in order to meet worldwide regulations for road use. This meant the car had to go through extensive development in order to meet the latest and most stringent safety and emission standards that the world's authorities demanded; Koenigsegg had to, for example, develop their own engines and other related technologies. Furthermore, Koenigsegg is the only low-volume sports car manufacturer to pass the new European pedestrian impact tests. Just after Koenigsegg passed this test, the requirement was deemed too complicated for compliance by low-volume manufacturers, so it is now unnecessary to meet these regulations if the production volume of a given model is less than 10,000 cars annually.

In 2007, Koenigsegg premiered the CCXR, a biofuel/flex-fuel version of the CCX. The car features a modified engine, fuel system, and engine management system that enables the car to run on normal gasoline or ethanol, and in any mixture between these two fuels. Ethanol has a higher octane rating compared to regular fuel and has an internal cooling effect on the combustion chamber, which allows for increased performance.

In 2009, Koenigsegg released information about a special edition car called the Trevita, of which three were planned to be made but only two were finished due to technical problems. The Trevita, which translates into English as "three whites", has a body made entirely of Koenigsegg's proprietary material consisting of diamond-coated carbon fibre. The Trevita is based on the CCXR, and therefore has a power output of  when running on biofuel.

In 2010 Koenigsegg released information at the 2010 Geneva Motor Show about a new model called the Agera, which translates into English as "take action/act". The Agera's design follows a clear lineage from the previous Koenigsegg sports cars, but adds many special new features, such as a wider front track, new styling and aerodynamic features, and a new interior; including a new lighting technique called "Ghost Light" by the manufacturer which consists of microscopic holes to hide the interior lighting until it is turned on, which then shines through what appears to be solid aluminium. Production of the Agera ended in July 2018 after being in production for eight years when two of the three final edition cars were presented to their customers.

At the 2015 Geneva Motor Show, Koenigsegg presented a new model named the Regera, which translates into English as to "reign" or "rule". The Regera uses the Koenigsegg Direct Drive (KDD) transmission. Below , motive power is by two electric motors on the rear wheels and the internal combustion engine (ICE) is disconnected. Above , the ICE is connected by a fixed ratio transmission with no gearbox, torque vectoring by the previously mentioned electric motors and boosted by a third electric motor attached to the driveshaft.

Koenigsegg initially based its engine on a V8 engine block from Ford Racing. These engines powered the initial run of the CC monikered cars. The block for the  V8 in the CCX (Competition Coupe Ten, to celebrate ten years of the company) was cast for Koenigsegg by Grainger & Worrall of the UK who also cast the block for the Agera's 5.0-litre engine.

In late 2018, Koenigsegg showed potential customers in Australia the replacement of the Agera via VR. Teaser sketches were released by the company at the same time. Initially, the model was rumoured to be called "Ragnarok" but the public unveil of the car at the 2019 Geneva Motor Show revealed the name to be Jesko, after the founder's father Jesko Von Koenigsegg.

The engine is mated to a 9-speed multi-clutch transmission having seven clutches called the "Light Speed Transmission" (LST) by the manufacturer. The focus of this transmission is to have faster shift times. The car will come in either a high-downforce, track-oriented or a low-drag, high speed Absolut variant.

On 3 March 2020, the Gemera was unveiled on an online broadcast. It is scheduled to be released to the public in 2022. There will be a limited production of 300 units. This will be Koenigsegg's first four-seater vehicle. The vehicle is powered by a small engine called the Koenigsegg TFG (Tiny Friendly Giant). The car also features full-length Koenigsegg Automated Twisted Synchrohelix Actuation Doors (KATSAD).

List of models 
 Koenigsegg CC (1994) 1 prototype
 Koenigsegg CC8S (2002–2003) 6 units (2 right hand drive) – 0–100 km/h (0–62 mph) under 3.5 sec. Top speed 390 km/h (243 mph) (claimed)
 Koenigsegg CCR (2004–2006) 14 units – 0–100 km/h (0–62 mph) 3.2 sec.  Top speed  (claimed);  (tested)
 Koenigsegg CCX (2006–2010) 29 units – 0–100 km/h (0–62 mph) 3.2 sec. Top speed  (claimed)
 Koenigsegg CCGT (2007) Only 1 unit developed for the sole purpose of competing in the FIA GT1
 Koenigsegg CCXR (2007–2009) 9 units – 0–100 km/h (0–62 mph) 3.1 sec.  Top speed  (claimed)
 Koenigsegg CCX Edition (2008) 2 units – 0–100 km/h (0–62 mph) 3.0 sec.  Top speed  (claimed)
 Koenigsegg CCXR Edition (2008) 4 units – 0–100 km/h (0–62 mph) 2.9 sec.  Top speed  (claimed)
 Koenigsegg CCXR Special Edition (2008–2009) 2 units – 0–100 km/h (0–62 mph) 2.9 sec.  Top speed  (claimed)
 Koenigsegg Trevita (2008–2009) 2 units – 0–100 km/h (0–62 mph) 2.9 sec. Top speed  (claimed)
 Koenigsegg Quant (2009) Solar Concept
 Koenigsegg Agera (2010) 7 units (2 became Agera R later on) – 0–100 km/h (0–62 mph) 3.0 sec. Top speed 420 km/h (261 mph) (claimed)
 Koenigsegg Agera R (2011–2014) 18 units (2 were converted from normal Agera)– 0–100 km/h (62 mph) 2.8 sec, 0–200 km/h (124 mph) 7.8 sec. Top speed 420 km/h (261 mph) (claimed)
 Koenigsegg Agera S (2013–2014) 5 units – 0–100 km/h (62 mph) 2.9 sec, 0–200 km/h (124 mph) 7.9 sec. Top speed 420 km/h (261 mph) (claimed)
 Koenigsegg One:1 (2014–2015) 6 units + 1 prototype – 0–400 km/h (248 mph) 20 sec. Top speed 440 km/h (274 mph) (claimed)
 Koenigsegg Agera RS (2015–2018) 27 units (overproduction by 2, there were just 25 units originally planned). 3 Agera RSR for Japanese market and 2 Agera XS included. Top speed  (tested)
 Koenigsegg Agera Final (2016–2018) 3 units
 Koenigsegg Regera (2016–2022) 80 units – 0–100 km/h (0–62 mph) 2.8 sec. Top speed 410 km/h (255 mph) (claimed)
 Koenigsegg Jesko (2021–) 125 units planned (Buyers have the option to choose between the track-oriented Jesko Attack or the speed-focused Jesko Absolut). Top speed is yet to be revealed.  
 Koenigsegg Jesko Absolut (2021–) Top speed  (claimed)
 Koenigsegg Gemera (2024–) 0–100 km/h (62 mph) 1.9 sec, $1.9 Million. 300 units planned.
 Koenigsegg CC850 (2024–) 50 units originally planned, later modified to 70 units – inspired by the Koenigsegg CC8S design, and commemorating Christian von Koenigsegg's 50th birthday and 20 years of the delivery of the first production vehicle (Koenigsegg CC8S).

Records

On 28 February 2005, at 12:08 pm local time, in Nardò, Italy, the CCR broke the Guinness World Record for the fastest production car in the world, having attained  on the Nardò Ring (a circular track of  circumference), breaking the record previously held by the McLaren F1.
Both of the records set by Bugatti and McLaren were set on Volkswagen's own test-track Ehra-Lessien, which features a  straight.

The CCX also accelerated from 0–200 km/h in 9.3 seconds.

In September 2011, the Agera R broke the Guinness World Record for 0–300 km/h with a time of 14.53 seconds and a 0–300–0 km/h time of 21.19 seconds. Koenigsegg improved this record with the One:1 on 8 June 2015. It attained 0–300 km/h in 11.92 seconds and 0–300–0 km/h in 17.95 seconds (a 3.24 sec improvement over the 2011 Koenigsegg Agera R record), it also attained 0–322 km/h (0–200 mph) in 14.328 seconds and 0–322–0 km/h in 20.71 seconds.

The record was set at the Vandel Airfield in Denmark and broke the record of 42 seconds set by the Bugatti Chiron a few weeks prior.

The record breaking run was done on a closed  section of Nevada State Route 160 in Pahrump, Nevada, United States. On the same day they also beat their own 0–400–0 km/h record they set a few weeks prior (33.29 seconds compared to the old record of 36.44 seconds). It was later confirmed via the instrumentation that the car topped out at 457.94 km/h (284.55 mph).

On 23 September 2019, Koenigsegg set a new 0–400–0 km/h world record when a Koenigsegg Regera completed the run in 31.49 seconds. This was 1.8 seconds faster than Koenigsegg's previously unbeaten record, set by the Agera RS in 2017.

Awards
 Top Gear – Award 2022 – The Jesko becomes BBC Top Gear Hypercar of the Year
 Top Gear – Award 2010 – The Agera becomes BBC Top Gear Hypercar of the Year
 Red Dot – Award for excellent Design
 National Swedish Design Prize – Utmärkt Svensk Form
 Entrepreneur of the Year Nomination – Företagarna Sweden
 Powercar – Superexotic import of the year 2007 and 2008 – Germany

References

External links

 
 Top Gear Award

Vehicle manufacturing companies established in 1994
Swedish brands
Companies based in Skåne County
Car manufacturers of Sweden
Sports car manufacturers
Car brands
Koenigsegg vehicles
Luxury motor vehicle manufacturers
1994 establishments in Sweden